World Gone Crazy is the thirteenth studio album by American rock band The Doobie Brothers, released on September 28, 2010. It debuted at number 39 on the Billboard top 200 albums chart, their highest charting position since 1989. The first single is a remake of their 1971 debut single "Nobody". Tom Johnston states about the album "This album has been in the mix for five years, but we didn’t seriously start putting the nuts and bolts together until three years ago."

Songwriting was split between guitarists Pat Simmons and Tom Johnston. The latter wrote the title track and he told Songfacts: "Part of the inspiration of 'World Gone Crazy' is the world has gotten a little nuts. And between the wars that we've had, between violence in the streets and most of the cities, what people are doing to each other around the world is not stuff that would have happened 20 years ago."

It was the first Doobie Brothers album to be produced by Ted Templeman since Farewell Tour twenty-seven years previously. Templeman had produced or co-produced every Doobie Brothers album up to that one. It was also the last of the group's albums to feature drummer Michael Hossack who died from cancer in 2012. Hossack's place in the touring band would be taken by former Brian Setzer sidesman Tony Pia. Harmonica player Norton Buffalo makes a posthumous appearance on "Don't Say Goodbye", which also features Michael McDonald on vocals.

Track listing

Personnel

The Doobie Brothers
 Tom Johnston - lead and backing vocals, acoustic guitars, electric guitars
 Pat Simmons - lead and backing vocals, acoustic guitars, electric guitars
 John McFee - backing vocals, acoustic guitars, electric guitars, banjo, mandolin, violin; drums, percussion (10)
 Michael Hossack - drums, percussion

Additional musicians
 Michael McDonald - vocals (7)
 Willie Nelson - vocals (10)
 Ross Hogarth - guitar (4); drums, percussion (10)
 Tim Pierce - guitar (4)
 Bob Glaub - bass (all but 10)
 James Hutchinson - bass (10)
 Gregg Bissonette - drums (4, 6)
 Joey Waronker - drums (8)
 Karl Perazzo - percussion (1, 6, 9, 13)
 Ted Templeman - tambourine (2)
 Guy Allison - piano, Wurlitzer electric piano, Hammond organ, other keyboards
 Bill Payne - piano (2, 4, 6, 8, 11), Hammond organ (1, 2, 4, 11, 13)
 Kim Bullard - synthesizer (5), keyboards (7, 9), piano (9)
 Norton Buffalo - harmonica (7)
 Marc Russo - saxophones (4, 13)
 Mic Gillette - trumpets, trombones (4, 13)
 Cameron Stone - cello (5)
 Siedah Garrett - backing vocals (1)
 Dorian Holley - backing vocals (1, 8, 13)
 Nayanna Holley - backing vocals (1, 13)
 Darryl Phinnessee -  backing vocals (1, 8)
 Amy Holland-McDonald - backing vocals (7)
 Gail Swanson - backing vocals (7)
 Tim James - backing vocals (9)

References 

 

The Doobie Brothers albums
2010 albums
Albums produced by Ted Templeman